Melaleuca exuvia is a plant in the myrtle family, Myrtaceae and is endemic to the south of Western Australia. It is easily distinguished by its unusual rough, minni ritchi bark which peels to reveal a new layer of smooth, salmon-pink bark. It is a newly described (2004) species which was formerly included in Melaleuca uncinata.

Description
Its leaves are erect, cylinder-shaped, linear to narrow elliptic and circular in cross-section, narrowing to a usually hooked end.

The flowers are white to yellow and arranged in heads containing 3 to 8 groups of flowers in threes.

Taxonomy and naming
The first formal description of this plant was made in 2004 by Lyndley Craven and Brendan Lepschi  in  Australian Systematic Botany from a specimen found at Key Rocks near Norseman. The specific epithet (exuvia) is from the Latin word meaning "cast skin" or "slough", referring to the unusual way this species sheds its bark.

Distribution and habitat
This melaleuca occurs in a small area in and between the Lort River, Lake Johnson and Queen Victoria Spring districts in the Coolgardie, Great Victoria Desert and Mallee biogeographic regions, growing sandy soils near drainage channels and the edge of salt lakes.

Conservation status
Melaleuca exuvia is listed as "not threatened" by the Government of Western Australia Department of Parks and Wildlife.

References

exuvia
Plants described in 2004
Endemic flora of Western Australia